Paddle Australia is the governing body for the sport of canoeing and kayaking in Australia.

History

The body was founded in Bexley, New South Wales on 10 September 1949 as the Australian Canoe Federation and affiliated with the International Canoe Federation in 1951. In 1996, the Australian Canoe Federation at its Annual General Meeting adopted a new Constitution and changed the name of the association to Australian Canoeing Inc. In 2015, this was changed to Australian Canoeing Ltd. In June 2018, the organization rebranded as Paddle Australia Ltd.

References

External links
 

Australia
Canoeing in Australia
Sports governing bodies in Australia
1949 establishments in Australia
Sports organizations established in 1949